The 1914 Georgia Tech Yellow Jackets football team represented the Georgia Tech Golden Tornado of the Georgia Institute of Technology during the 1914 college football season. The Tornado was coached by John Heisman in his 11th year as head coach, compiling a record of 6–2. Georgia Tech played its home games at Grant Field.

Schedule

References

Georgia Tech Yellow Jackets
Georgia Tech Yellow Jackets football seasons
1914 in sports in Georgia (U.S. state)